High Stakes Poker is an American cash game poker television program. The poker variant played on the show is no limit Texas hold 'em. The first four seasons ran from January 16, 2006 to December 17, 2007 on GSN. The next three seasons ran from March 1, 2009 to May 21, 2011, and was simulcast in 3DTV on N3D. The show was revived on December 16, 2020 on PokerGO.

The show was hosted by A. J. Benza in the first five seasons, alongside Gabe Kaplan. In the sixth season, Kara Scott replaced Benza as Kaplan's co-host, with Scott conducting interviews from the poker room floor. In the seventh season, Norm Macdonald replaced Kaplan as Scott's co-host. Beginning with the eighth season, Benza and Kaplan returned as hosts. After the first episode of the tenth season, Kaplan retired and was replaced by Nick Schulman.

History 
The first season of High Stakes Poker, taped at the Golden Nugget in Las Vegas, was first broadcast on January 16, 2006, at 9:00 p.m., and consisted of 13 episodes until April 10, 2006, hosted by A. J. Benza and comedian/actor-turned-poker pro Gabe Kaplan.

The second season, taped at The Palms and consisting of 16 episodes, premiered on June 5, 2006, at 9:00 p.m., and ended on September 18, 2006.

The third season, consisting of 13 episodes, was taped at the South Point Casino at 9:00 p.m. and premiered on January 15, 2007, and ended on April 9, 2007. New players for the third season included Jamie Gold, Phil Ivey, Chris Ferguson, Patrik Antonius, Paul Wasicka, David Benyamine, Brian Townsend, and others. Returning players from previous seasons included Doyle Brunson, Daniel Negreanu, Sammy Farha, Phil Laak, Jennifer Harman, Barry Greenstein, Erick Lindgren, Mike Matusow, Brad Booth, and others.

On April 2, 2007, GSN announced that High Stakes Poker would return for a fourth season, again taped at South Point. Taping was completed in May, with the season premiering on August 27, 2007 at 9:00 p.m. Returning players included Patrik Antonius, David Benyamine, Doyle Brunson, Eli Elezra, Sam Farha, Jamie Gold, Barry Greenstein, Phil Hellmuth Jr., Jennifer Harman, and Daniel Negreanu. Newcomers for the fourth season include Brandon Adams, Mike Baxter, Brian Brandon, Phil Galfond, Guy Laliberté, Bob Safai, Antonio Salorio, and Haralabos Voulgaris. The later episodes of this season featured a $500,000 minimum buy-in (compared to the regular $100,000 minimum) and these games saw more than $5 million in play on the table at one time. Season four finished airing on December 17, 2007, and featured 17 episodes. The network cited the show's strong ratings performance in younger demographics.

Season five which ran from March 1, 2009, to May 24, 2009, at 9:00 p.m., was taped at the Golden Nugget on December 19, 2008, to December 21, 2008, and featured a minimum cash buy-in of $200,000. The format for season five differed slightly from its predecessors by having Kaplan and Benza not appear on camera until after the first commercial break in the show rather than at the outset.

Season six premiered at 8:00 p.m. on February 14, 2010, and ended on May 9, 2010, with Kaplan and Kara Scott. It was taped for a second straight season at the Golden Nugget. The sixth season aired with three different groups of players throughout 13 episodes. Tom Dwan and Phil Ivey bought in for $500,000. Other rotating players, including newcomers Jason Mercier, Dennis Phillips, Andrew Robl, and Lex Veldhuis, bought in for $200,000.

Season seven debuted on its new GSN Saturday night time slot at 8:00 p.m. from February 26, 2011, to May 21, 2011. Norm Macdonald replaced Kaplan as the host and Kara Scott conducted interviews from the poker room floor. The series was filmed in December 2010 at the Bellagio in Las Vegas. Sponsored Full Tilt Poker pros were required to boycott the show this time around, as rival site PokerStars became its official sponsors. Thus, "High Stakes Poker" Season 7 is devoid of such Full Tilt pros as Phil Ivey, Jennifer Harman, Tom Dwan, Patrik Antonius, David Benyamine, Mike Matusow, and Eli Elezra. GSN later announced it would be scaling back its airings of High Stakes Poker after PokerStars pulled out of the U.S. market following the indictments in United States v. Scheinberg et al. crackdown on online gambling.

Season eight ran for 14 episodes from December 16, 2020 to March 17, 2021 on the streaming service PokerGO. It was taped at the Aria Resort and Casino. Season nine ran from February 21 to May 23, 2022 for 14 episodes. Season ten premiered on January 24, 2023.

Format 
When it first aired, High Stakes Poker was unique among televised poker series because it did not take place in a tournament setting. Instead, the program showed a high-stakes cash game. The minimum buy-in to the game is $100,000, but players have bought in for as much as $1,000,000, such as Daniel Negreanu in Season 1 and Brad Booth in Season 3. For part of the fourth season, the minimum buy-in was $500,000. The first episode with the minimum $500,000 buy-in was broadcast on November 5, 2007. The minimum cash buy-in for the fifth season increased to $200,000 – the largest buy-in for an entire run of a television series. Unlike in poker tournaments, the chips involved represent real money. If a player loses his or her initial buy-in, that player may rebuy a minimum of $50,000. In addition, players may use cash instead of casino chips. Cash plays and stays as cash in the pot, it does not have to be converted into casino chips. Unlike tournament poker, blinds and antes are constant, instead of increasing as time goes on. High Stakes Poker has $300/$600 blinds with a $100 ante. The fourth season features three forced blinds of $300, $600, and $1,200, with a "straddle" or optional fourth blind of $2,400.

The players include poker professionals along with amateurs such as Jerry Buss and Fred Chamanara. The show was created by executive producer Henry Orenstein. In season one, Daniel Negreanu confirmed in a post on his website's forums that all players were paid $1,250 per hour for taking part and that 13 episodes were edited down from 24 hours of actual play. 2006 WSOP Main Event Champion Jamie Gold commented that players were paid for participating, though they had to put much more money at risk to get to play the game. Gold also spoke about his interactions with other players, particularly Mike Matusow. The theme song for the show is titled "I'm All In", written and performed by John Pratt.

Notable hands

Large pots 
In Season 2, Gus Hansen won $575,700 with four fives, beating Daniel Negreanu's full house. The pot was $11,700, and the flop came . Hansen checked his set of fives with a 4% chance of winning the hand, and Negreanu bet $8,000 with his set of sixes and a 94% chance of winning. Hansen raised to $26,000 and Negreanu called, bringing the pot to $63,700. The turn came , making Hansen quad fives, leaving Negreanu a 2% underdog with his full house. Hansen bet $24,000, and Negreanu called, slow playing his full house. The pot was now $111,700. The river came . Hansen checked, and Negreanu bet $65,000. Hansen then went all in for his remaining $232,000, bringing the pot to $408,700. Negreanu called, and Hansen won the pot of $575,700. This was the largest pot before the $500,000 minimum buy-in game played during Season 4.

In the November 12, 2007, episode of Season 4, Jamie Gold won $495,867 of a $743,800 pot that developed between Gold with three Kings on the turn card, and Patrik Antonius with a straight on the turn card. Antonius held  and Gold had pocket K. After the  flop and  turn, Antonius was a 4-to-1 favorite with his straight vs. Gold's three kings. Gold moved all-in and Antonius called. With such a large amount at stake, the players agreed to run the river (deal the river card) three times. The first river card, and the second river run, both paired the board to give two wins to Gold with a full house. The third river run, kept Antonius' straight in front. As a result, Gold won $495,867 from the pot and Antonius won $247,933. Antonius' calm demeanor after the hand prompted host A.J. Benza to comment, "I'll tell you one thing: Patrik can take a punch. Imagine if that was Phil Hellmuth."

In the November 26, 2007 episode of Season 4, Doyle Brunson won a $818,100 pot against Guy Laliberté. Brunson held  and Laliberté . Brunson bet the turn, and Laliberte raised and Brunson moved all-in and was called. The players agreed to run the river twice. Brunson was a 75% favorite with his better kicker and flush draw, and he won both times to take the entire pot. After the hand, Brunson said, "When you don't make a pair for eight hours, you go crazy."

Later in that same November 26, 2007, episode of Season 4, Patrik Antonius won $749,100 from a $998,800 pot that developed between Antonius with a pair of nines on the flop, and Sammy Farha with a king-high flush draw.  Antonius went all-in after the flop and Farha called. The odds were roughly even, and the players agreed to run the turn and river four times. Antonius won three times to take three-quarters of the pot, $749,100, while Farha won $249,700.

In Season 4, Guy Laliberté and David Benyamine created a pot of $1,227,900 — the largest in High Stakes Poker history — before negotiating a reduction of the pot to "only" $238,900.  David had  and Laliberté had  and the flop came  giving Laliberté top two pair and Benyamine the nut flush draw. Acting after Farha, Benyamine raised to $43,000 and Laliberté reraised to $168,000. Farha folded his , Benyamine went all-in, and Laliberté called, bringing the pot to $1,227,900. After turning the respective cards over, Laliberté, knowing he was the favorite, offered to run it once or twice. After further negotiation, Laliberté offered to take the pot previous to the raises of $238,900. Benyamine agreed. Antonio Esfandiari and a couple of other players wanted to see the turn and river, but Laliberté and Benyamine refused.

In Season 5, Tom Dwan won the biggest pot — $919,600 — to be played straight up (with no side-deals or multiple runs). Dwan won with three Queens, beating Barry Greenstein's two pair – Aces and Queens. The flop came , causing Dwan to bet on his pair of Queens and a King high flush draw, Eastgate to fold, Greenstein to raise with his pair of Aces and backdoor straight draw, Dwan to reraise, and finally Greenstein to push all-in, which Dwan quickly called. Greenstein had turned down Dwan's offer to run it twice on an earlier hand (in which Dwan had the best hand when they went all-in, though Greenstein ultimately won), and this time Greenstein again wanted to run it only once, but offered to take some of their money back, which Dwan turned down stating "sorry...no" Commentator Gabe Kaplan noted the comparison with the earlier hand when Greenstein would not run it twice. At this point, it was almost an exactly even race.

Large bluffs 
The flop came , Ivey's overpair was a 79% favorite to Booth's inside straight draw and backdoor flush draw. After Ivey bet $23,000 on the flop to make the pot $54,100, Booth raised to $300,000. Ivey folded.

At the beginning of Season 4, the players agreed that anyone who won a pot while holding the weakest possible hold 'em hand (2–7) would be paid $500 by every other player at the table. This led to several five-figure bluffs that were calculated to pick up the $3,500 bonus (and the respect of the table). Phil Hellmuth won the 7-2 bonus in the second televised hand of the season, making a $40,000 bet on the river that caused Mike Matusow to lay down pocket Kings.

The biggest unsuccessful bluff occurred as a result of this $500 for 2–7 rule. Amateurs Antonio Salorio and Brian Brandon went to a raised flop with 2–7 and K-K respectively. When Brandon flopped the best possible hand with K-4-K, Salorio continued to bet hard on his 2–7 bluff, eventually losing more than $100,000 of his own bets before giving up when Brandon raised on the turn.

In Season 5, Tom Dwan executed a successful bluff against Barry Greenstein and Peter Eastgate in a pot that stood at $133,500 pre-bluff. Dwan won with a pair of tens against Barry Greenstein's higher pair of Aces and Peter Eastgate's (then) leading trip deuces. Before the flop came out there was $21,400 in the pot and at this point, Dwan jokingly offered to chop the pot. Greenstein led out with $10,000 after some thought, and with seven people behind him, Dwan raised the pot to $37,300. David Benyamine, Eli Elezra, Ilari Sahamies and Daniel Negreanu all quickly folded. The action came back to Eastgate, who called, as did Greenstein. After some thought, Dwan (a 95% underdog at this point) bet $104,200, causing Eastgate and Greenstein to reluctantly fold. Following the hand, Dwan was quick to announce he was bluffing by stating, "Peter had the best hand, I'll make a sidebet that Peter had the best hand." Doyle Brunson accepted, and eventually lost $9,000 when Peter, after a $1,000 bribe from Dwan, announced he had a trip deuces a few episodes later. After the hand was done, commentator Gabe Kaplan said that the only other person he knew who would have made a similar move was "maybe the late Stu Ungar.”

In Season 6, Tom Dwan executed a successful bluff against Phil Ivey in a pot that stood at $408,700 pre-bluff. The turn came, and Dwan fired again, this time $123,200. Ivey again called with his flush and inside straight draws, creating a pot of $408,700. The river came, leaving Ivey with a small pair and Dwan with 9 high. Dwan bet another $268,200. Ivey considered calling for over 3 minutes (according to the TV show), but ultimately folded.

In Season 7, amateur player Bill Klein opted to see the river in a $192,800 pot, by calling the re-raise to $67,000 by professional Phil Galfond of his $28,000 bet. Klein held  for a flush draw, and Galfond, holding , had a straight on a board that read . "Looks like Klein's creative juices may be flowing", quipped commentator Norm Macdonald, as Klein slid a tower of 30 $5,000 chips forward equalling $150,000. After Galfond folded, Bill Klein showed the bluff and received a standing ovation and fist-bumps from around the table.

Quick loss 
In a single episode of Season 6, Daniel Negreanu lost a total of $380,000 in two hands, both to Mike Matusow. In the first hand, Negreanu went all-in on trip nines, holding  on a  board. Matusow, however, had flopped a full house since he held . In the second hand, Matusow went all-in as the favorite on a flop of  holding  for a flush draw and two overcards. The players agreed to run the turn and river twice; Matusow completed the flush both times.

Players 

These players appeared in the first seven seasons: Doyle Brunson, Antonio Esfandiari, Barry Greenstein, and Daniel Negreanu. None of them returned for the eighth season, while only Phil Hellmuth, Tom Dwan, Phil Ivey, and Brandon Adams appeared in both the original High Stakes Poker, and season 8.

Key sponsors 
Most seasons included a key sponsor. Over the years, they included notable companies like PokerStars, Full Tilt Poker, and Bellagio. The eight season is sponsored by Poker King, an online poker app focused on the Asian market.

See also 
 Poker After Dark

References

External links 
 
 GSN website (archived)
 
 High Stakes Poker All Seasons Statistics

2006 American television series debuts
2007 American television series endings
2009 American television series debuts
2011 American television series endings
2020 American television series debuts
American television series revived after cancellation
Game Show Network original programming
Poker in Las Vegas
Television shows about poker
Television shows set in the Las Vegas Valley